Clayton-le-Dale is a village and civil parish situated on the A59 road near Blackburn, in Lancashire, England. The population of the civil parish as of the 2011 census was 1,228.  The village is in the Ribble Valley local government district.

The parish is mainly agricultural. Since the foot-and-mouth crisis in 2001 local businesses have started to diversify; for example Dowsons started making ice cream on their dairy farm and supplying Asda and Booths supermarkets, as well as producing unusual flavours of ice cream including black pudding flavour.

Other examples of diversification in Clayton-le-Dale include tourism, and the development of industrial units in the village with Fairfield Business Park giving home to companies such as Ski & Trek, Evabel Ltd, Paul Case Furniture, and Mellor Cars.

See also

Listed buildings in Clayton-le-Dale
Ribchester Bridge

References

External links

Villages in Lancashire
Civil parishes in Lancashire
Geography of Ribble Valley